Doña María de la Asunción Ferrer y Crespí de Valdaura (died 1818) was a Spanish painter.

Ferrer y Crespí was named an Académica de mérito at the Academia de San Carlos in Valencia on 26 October 1795, presenting as her reception piece a head after Guido Reni, in a gold frame and glazed. In 1897 her work could still be found in a variety of Valencian private collections, and she was especially known for her pastel pieces.

References

Year of birth unknown
1818 deaths
Painters from the Valencian Community
18th-century Spanish painters
18th-century Spanish women artists
19th-century Spanish painters
19th-century Spanish women artists
Pastel artists